The following is a list of MTV Asia Awards winners for Favorite Artist Mainland China.

MTV Asia Awards
Chinese music awards